The National Democratic Party of Germany ( or NPD) is a far-right Neo-Nazi and ultranationalist political party in Germany.

The party was founded in 1964 as successor to the German Reich Party (DRP). Party statements also self-identify the party as Germany's "only significant patriotic force". On 1 January 2011, the nationalist German People's Union merged with the NPD and the party name of the National Democratic Party of Germany was extended by the addition of "The People's Union".

The party is a neo-Nazi organization and has been referred to as "the most significant neo-Nazi party to emerge after 1945". The German Federal Agency for Civic Education, or BPB, has criticized the NPD for working with members of organizations which were later found unconstitutional by the federal courts and disbanded, while the Federal Office for the Protection of the Constitution, Germany's domestic security agency, classifies the NPD as a "threat to the constitutional order" because of its platform and ideology, and it is under their observation. An effort to outlaw the party failed in 2003, because the government had many informers and agents in the party, some in high position, who had written part of the material used against them.
Since its founding in 1964, the NPD has never managed to win enough votes on the federal level to cross Germany's 5% minimum threshold for representation in the Bundestag; it has succeeded in crossing the 5% threshold and gaining representation in state parliaments 11 times, including one-convocation entry to seven West German state parliaments between November 1966 and April 1968 and two-convocation electoral success in two East German states of Saxony and Mecklenburg-Vorpommern between 2004 and 2011. Since 2016, the NPD has not been represented in state parliaments. Udo Voigt led the NPD from 1996 to 2011. He was succeeded by Holger Apfel, who in turn was replaced by Udo Pastörs in December 2013. In November 2014, Pastörs was ousted and Frank Franz became the party's leader. Voigt was elected the party's first Member of the European Parliament in 2014. The party lost the seat in the 2019 European Parliament election.

History

Early history
In the 1950s, despite the overall failure of de-Nazification, early right-wing extremist parties in West Germany failed to attract voters away from the moderate government that had presided over Germany's recovery. In November 1964, however, right-wing splinter groups united to form the NPD. One of the four founding members was Adolf von Thadden (1921–1996), alleged to have been an agent for the British MI6. Thadden had a British grandmother and was NPD chairman from 1967 to 1971. Owing to von Thadden's effective leadership the NPD achieved success in the late 1960s, winning local government seats across West Germany. In 1966 and 1967, fuelled by West German discontent with a lagging economy and with the leadership of Chancellor Ludwig Erhard, the NPD won 15 seats in Bavaria, 10 in lower Saxony, 8 in Hesse, and several other seats. However, the NPD did not then and has never since received the minimum 5% of votes in federal elections that allow a party to send delegates to the German Parliament. The NPD came closest to that goal in the 1969 election, when it received 4.3 percent of the vote. Helping pave the way for these NPD gains were an economic downturn, frustrations with the emerging leftist youth counter-culture, and the emergence of a tripartite coalition government among the center-right Christian Democratic Party (CDU), the Christian Social Union (the CDU's present-day sister party), and the center-left Social Democratic Party (SPD). The coalition government had created a vacuum in the traditional political right wing, which the NPD tried to fill. Additionally, the party benefited from hostility to the growing immigrant population and fears that the government would repudiate claims to the "lost territories" (pre-World War II German territory east of the Oder-Neisse River.) The historian Walter Laqueur has argued that the NPD in the 1960s cannot be classified as a neo-Nazi party.

Yet, when the coalition fell apart, around 75 percent of those who had voted for the NPD drifted back to the center-right. During the 1970s, the NPD went into decline, suffering from an internal split over failing to get into the German Parliament. The issue of immigration spurred a small rebound in popular interest from the mid-1980s to the early 1990s, but the party only saw limited success in various local elections.

Recent history
In September 2019, the NPD politician Stefan Jagsch was elected as representative of Altenstadt-Waldsiedlung. The unanimous election of the NPD politician by the local council led to irritation and horror in other parties, such as Angela Merkel's Christian Democratic Union (CDU), the center-left Social Democrats (SPD), and the liberal Free Democratic Party (FDP), whose local council members had voted for Jagsch.

Electoral history
Since its founding in 1964, the NPD has only won seats in regional assemblies. Its successes in state parliaments can be grouped into two periods: the late 1960s (1966 in Hesse; 1967 in Bremen, Lower Saxony, Rhineland-Palatinate, and Schleswig-Holstein; and 1968 in Baden-Württemberg and Bavaria), and former East Germany since reunification (2006 and 2011 in Mecklenburg-Vorpommern, 2004 and 2009 in Saxony).

In the 2004 state election in Saxony, the NPD won 9.2% of the overall vote. After the 2009 state election in Saxony, the NPD sent eight representatives to the Saxony state parliament, having lost four representatives since the 2004 election. The NPD lost their representation in Saxony at the 2014 state election. They also lost all representation in Mecklenburg-Vorpommern at the 2016 state election.

The NPD maintained a non-competition agreement with the German People's Union (DVU) between 2004 and 2009. The third nationalist-oriented party, the Republicans (REP), has so far refused to join this agreement. However, Kerstin Lorenz, a local representative of the Republicans in Saxony, sabotaged her party's registration to help the NPD in the Saxony election.

In the 2005 federal elections, the NPD received 1.6 per cent of the vote nationally. It garnered the highest per cent of votes in the states of Saxony (4.9 per cent), Thuringia (3.7 per cent), Mecklenburg-Vorpommern (3.5 per cent) and Brandenburg (3.2 per cent). In most other states, the party won around 1 percent of the total votes cast. In the 2006 Mecklenburg-Vorpommern state election, the NPD received 7.3% of the vote and thus achieved state representation there, as well.

The NPD had 5,300 registered party members in 2004. Over the course of 2006, the NPD processed roughly 2,000 party applications to push the membership total over 7,200. In 2008, the trend of a growing number of members has been reversed and NPD's membership is estimated at 7,000.

In the 2014 European elections, Udo Voigt was elected as the party's first Member of the European Parliament.

2001–2003 banning attempt
In 2001, the federal government, the Bundestag, and the Bundesrat jointly attempted to have the Federal Constitutional Court of Germany ban the NPD. The court, the highest court in Germany, has the exclusive power to ban parties if they are found to be "anti-constitutional" through the Basic Law for the Federal Republic of Germany. However, the petition was rejected in 2003 after it was discovered that a number of the NPD's inner circle, including as many as 30 of its top 200 leaders were undercover agents or informants of the German secret services, like the federal Bundesamt für Verfassungsschutz. They include a former deputy chairman of the party and author of an anti-Semitic tract that formed a central part of the government's case. Since the secret services were unwilling to fully disclose their agents' identities and activities, the court found it impossible to decide which moves by the party were based on genuine party decisions and which were controlled by the secret services in an attempt to further the ban. The court determined that so many of the party's actions were influenced by the government that the resulting "lack of clarity" made it impossible to defend a ban. "The presence of the state at the leadership level makes influence on its aims and activities unavoidable," it concluded.

Horst Mahler (NPD), a former member of the far-left terrorist organisation Red Army Faction, defended the NPD before the court. In May 2009, several state politicians published an extensive document which they claim proves the NPD's opposition to the constitution without relying on information supplied by undercover agents. This move was intended to lead up to a second attempt to have the NPD banned.

Merger with DVU
At the 2010 NPD party conference at Bamberg it was announced that the party would ask its members to approve a merger with the German People's Union (DVU). After the merger on 1 January 2011, the combined party briefly used the name NPD – Die Volksunion (NPD - The People's Union). Between 2004 and 2009 the two parties had agreed not to compete against each other in elections. However, on 27 January 2011, Munich's Landgericht (regional court) in a preliminary injunction declared the merger null and void.

The Green Movement 
The National Democratic party has recently supported the green movement. This is one of many strategies the party has used to try to gain supporters. Historically the opposing party the German Greens have fully supported the green movement in Germany. The German Greens group was a successful European ecological group that began in 1980. Kate Connolly who is a correspondent for The Guardian wrote the article: German far-right extremists tap into green movement for support. In the article Connolly explains the opposition between these two political groups pertaining to the green movement. The Artaman league is essential in understanding the green movements history. This was a farming movement that was inspired by the "blood and soil" ruralist ideology adopted from the Nazis. This farming movement affected the Mecklenburg region of Germany during the 19th century. Settlers at this time took advantage of the cheap cost of land in these rural communities. These settlers were in support of the Artaman league and continued to reinforce the ideology.

The NDP's plans are to take the ecological movement back from the German Greens group. Connolly spoke to different farmers, organizations, and employees of the government to represent the different perspectives of the ecological movement. Hans-Gunter Laimer a farmer who ran for election for the NPD mentions his frustration that the German Greens groups has dominated the organic farming market for too long. He has also been linked to other German groups specifically Umwelt and Aktiv. Both political parties are concerned with the ways they are in opposition to one another. The NPD supporters of the green movement are in favour of local produce. However, they are against GMOS, pesticides, and intensive livestock. Organisations involved in the farming industry have lost consumers because they are not able to state what the political views of the farmers products are to the consumer. For example, BioPark is an organic cultivation organisation with a vetting process to certify organic farmers. The vetting process is strictly based on cultivation methods and not on political affiliations. BioPark has lost costumers because left-leaning supporters worry buying local organic produce is supporting the far-right extremist.

The department of rural enlightenment has supported the importance of distinguishing between these two political parties. The department created a brochure called "Nature Conservation Versus Right-wing Extremist". The brochure was created in order to help consumers distinguish from the far-right extremists. Other representatives from the government have spoken on this divide. For example, Connolly mentions a representative of the Centre for Democratic culture in Mecklenburg who chose to stay anonymous in order to protect themself. The representative stated the goal of the NDP is to build bridges between citizens. The NDP is strategic in the way they are going about this in a subtle quite manner. The result the NDP is trying to achieve is to reinforce the division between the two political parties for when NDP no longer becomes associated with politics.

World War II and Holocaust commemoration controversies

On 21 January 2005, during a moment of silence in the Saxon state assembly in Dresden to mark the 60th anniversary of the liberation of the Nazi Auschwitz extermination camp, twelve members of the NPD walked out in protest. The NPD stated that they were upset that a moment of silence was being held for those who were murdered in the Auschwitz camp and that none was being given for those who died during the bombing of Dresden in World War II, with the anniversary of both events falling relatively close to each other. Holger Apfel, leader of the NPD in Saxony and deputy leader of the party nationwide, made a speech in the Saxon State Parliament in which he called the Allied forces of the United States and the United Kingdom "mass murderers" because of their role in the bombing. His colleague Jürgen Gansel went on to describe the bombing itself as a "holocaust of bombs".

Voigt voiced his support and reiterated the statement, which some controversially claimed was a violation of the German law which forbids Holocaust denial. However, after judicial review, it was decided that Udo Voigt's description of the 1945 RAF bombing of Dresden as a holocaust was an exercise of free speech and "defamation of the dead" was not the purpose of his statement.

In 2009, the NPD joined the Junge Landsmannschaft Ostdeutschland in a demonstration on the anniversary of the bombing of Dresden in World War II. Roughly 6,000 people came to participate in the event.

Activism and controversy

The NPD's strategy has been to create "nationally liberated zones" and circumvent its marginal electoral status by concentrating on regions where support is strongest. In March 2006, musician Konstantin Wecker tried to set up an in-school anti-fascist concert in Halberstadt, Saxony-Anhalt two weeks before the state elections. The NPD argued that because of politics, the date and the in-school venue, the concert "was an unacceptable form of political campaigning." In protest, the NPD vowed to buy the tickets and turn up en masse at Wecker's show, which led local authorities to cancel the event. The Social Democrats and the Greens were outraged by the decision, which the Central Council of Jews in Germany criticized as "politically bankrupt".

The NPD was going to sponsor a march through Leipzig on 21 June 2006, as the 2006 World Cup was going on. The party wanted to show its support for the Iranian national football team, which was playing in Leipzig, and Iranian President Mahmoud Ahmadinejad. However, the NPD decided against the demonstration; only a counter-demonstration took place that day, in support of Israel. During the World Cup, the party's web site stated that due to the prevalence of people of non-German descent on the Germany national football team, the team "was not really German".

Later in 2006, the party designed leaflets, which said "White – not just the color of a jersey! For a true National team!" This leaflet was never mass-distributed, but copies were confiscated during a raid on the NPD's headquarters, when authorities had been hoping to find material linking the party to Nazism. Patrick Owomoyela was later informed about the poster after it was noted that the image depicted a footballer wearing a white jersey with Owomoyela's number on it. Owomoyela, of Nigerian descent, had played for the Germany national team in the years before the World Cup and proceeded to file a lawsuit against the party. The party was able to delay the procedures but in April 2009 three party officials (Udo Voigt, Frank Schwerdt and Klaus Beier) were sentenced for Volksverhetzung (Voigt and Beier to 7 months on probation, Schwerdt to 10 months on probation).

In November 2008, shortly after the 2008 United States presidential election, the NPD published a document entitled "Africa conquers the White House" which stated that the election of Barack Obama as the first African-American President of the United States was the result of "the American alliance of Jews and Negroes" and that Obama aimed to destroy the United States' "white identity". The NPD claimed, "A non-white America is a declaration of war on all people who believe an organically grown social order based on language and culture, history and heritage to be the essence of humanity" and "Barack Obama hides this declaration of war behind his pushy sunshine smile." The NPD also stated that the extensive support for Obama in Germany "resembles an African tropical disease."

In September 2009, another incident involving the NPD and a football player of the Germany national team was reported. In a television show of a regional channel, NPD spokesman Beier called midfielder Mesut Özil a "Plaste-Deutscher" ("Plastic German" or "ID Card German"), meaning someone who is not born German, but becomes German by naturalisation, particularly for certain benefits. The German Football Association announced that they would immediately file a lawsuit against the NPD and their spokesman, if requested by Özil.

During the Gaza War in 2009, the NPD planned a "Holocaust" vigil for Gaza in support of the Palestinians. Charlotte Knobloch, the head of the Central Council of Jews in Germany, said "joint hatred of everything Jewish is unifying neo-Nazis and Islamists." Knobloch claimed German-Palestinian protestors "unashamedly admitted" that they would vote for the NPD during the next election.

In 2009, the NPD hung anti-Polish posters with slogan "Polen-Invasion Stoppen" ("Stop the Polish invasion") in Dresden and Görlitz. Mayor of Görlitz and then Chancellor of Germany, Angela Merkel, condemned the posters.

In April 2009, the party was fined 2.5 million euros for filing incorrect financial statements, resulting, according to German broadcaster Deutsche Welle, in "serious financial trouble" for its administration.

On 23 September 2009, four days before the federal elections, German police raided the Berlin headquarters of the NPD to investigate claims that letters sent from the NPD to politicians from immigrant backgrounds incited racial hatred. The NPD leader in Berlin defended the letters saying that "As part of a democracy, we're entitled to say if something doesn't suit us in this country."

2011 banning attempt
In 2011, authorities were reportedly trying to link the party, and specifically 30-year-old national organization director Patrick Wieschke, to the so-called "Zwickau terrorist cell". This raised the possibility of another effort to outlaw the party. The cell had been implicated in a string of murders and the November robbery of a savings bank in Eisenach. Authorities were also pursuing a gun case against Ralf Wohlleben, former deputy chairman of the party's branch in Thuringia, though the latter case was reportedly unlikely to translate into a national-level challenge to the party's legal standing. The likelihood of success of renewed banning attempts has been questioned, given the Office for the Protection of the Constitution has over 130 informants in the party, some in high positions, raising the question of whether the party is effectively controlled by the government.

2012 Thor Steinar clothing controversy
In June 2012, several NPD members of Saxony's parliament attended the parliament's sittings wearing clothing from Thor Steinar, a clothing brand that is popular amongst neo-Nazis; the legislature responded by saying that such provocative clothing was not permitted to be worn in the parliament and demanded that the NPD members remove and replace their attire; the NPD members refused, resulting in the members being expelled from the parliament and banned from attending the next three parliamentary sittings. The NPD members denied accusations that they wore the shirts as a deliberate provocation.

2012 banning attempt
German officials tried to outlaw the party again in December 2012, with the interior ministers of all 16 states recommending a ban. The Federal Constitutional Court is yet to vote on the recommendation. In March 2013 the Merkel government said it would not try to ban the NPD.

2016 banning attempt
German officials again tried to outlaw the NPD by submitting a request to the Federal Constitutional Court in 2016.

On 17 January 2017, the second senate of the Federal Constitutional Court rejected the attempt to outlaw the party. The reasoning behind the decision was that the NPD's political significance is virtually nonexistent at both the state and federal levels and that as such, the party had no chance of posing a significant threat to the constitutional order. It was also reasoned that outlawing the party would not change the mindset and political ideology of its members and supporters, who in the event of a ban could simply form a new movement under a different name.
However, the Court also openly acknowledged that NPD is unconstitutional based on its manifesto and ideology, citing "links to neo-Nazism" and that "anti-semitism was a structural element of the party ideology" in its reasoning. The Court also indirectly suggested that state grants or other financial contributions should not be given to such parties to further their unconstitutional cause. This prompted calls by the public for the proposal of a constitutional amendment which would forbid unconstitutional parties' financing to the Basic Law for the Federal Republic of Germany. The proposal was criticised by the interior policy spokesman of Die Linke, who claimed that such a constitutional amendment could stand to serve as a politically dubious way to remove a political opponent. Law Professor Hans Herbert von Arnim defended the rights of small parties, including the NPD.

Platform and ideology 

The NPD is a neo-Nazi political party. It calls itself a party of "grandparents and grandchildren" because the 1960s generation in Germany, known for the leftist student movement, strongly opposes the NPD's policies. The NPD's economic program promotes social security for Germans and control against plutocracy. They discredit and reject the "liberal-capitalist system".

The NPD argues that NATO fails to represent the interests and needs of European people. The party considers the European Union to be little more than a reorganisation of a Soviet-style government of Europe along financial lines. Although highly critical of the EU, as long as Germany remains a part of it, the NPD opposes Turkey's incorporation into the organisation. Voigt envisions future collaboration and continued friendly relations with other nationalists and European nationalist parties. The NPD is strongly anti-Zionist, frequently criticizing the policies and activities of Israel.

The NPD's platform asserts that Germany is larger than the present-day Federal Republic, and calls for a return of German territory lost after World War II, a foreign policy position abandoned by the German government in 1990.

In the early 21st century, long-standing efforts to ban the party were renewed. The 2005 report of the Federal Office for the Protection of the Constitution contains the following description:
The party continues to pursue a "people's front" of the nationalists [consisting of] the NPD, DVU, and forces not attached to any party, which is supposed to develop into a base for an encompassing 'German people's movement'. The aggressive agitation of the NPD unabashedly aims towards the abolition of parliamentary democracy and the democratic constitutional state, although the use of violence is currently still officially rejected for tactical reasons. Statements of the NPD document an essential affinity with Nazism; its agitation is racist, antisemitic, homophobic, revisionist, and intends to disparage the democratic and lawful order of the constitution.

International connections

Voigt has held meetings with various proponents of white nationalism, including David Duke, a US white nationalist, author, politician, and activist. Between 1989 and 1992, the International Third Position began to ally itself with the NPD in Germany and Forza Nuova in Italy.

They have been in contact with Youth Defence, the Irish anti-abortion group, since 1996. Justin Barrett, former leader of Youth Defence and current President of the National Party of Ireland, has spoken at their events in Passau in 2000.

The NPD has also links with the Romanian neo-Legionary group Noua Dreaptă.

Connections with Croatian far right

The party also has connections with far-right parties and politicians in Croatia. In 2017, according to the claims of Dražen Keleminec, president of the marginal far-right Autochthonous Croatian Party of Rights (A-HSP), NPD party member Alexander Neidlein took part in the party's march to show their support and declare allegiance to then-recently elected American president Donald Trump. During the march, the party's members, dressed in black uniforms, were waving flags of the NPD and the United States while shouting the Ustasha salute "Za dom spremni". The following day, the U.S. embassy in Zagreb reacted by publishing a statement in which they strongly condemned the march and rejected any attempts to connect the United States with Ustasha ideology.

In 2018, Croatian far-right MP Željko Glasnović took part in the party congress in the town of Büdingen, expressing his support for them.

Youth wing

Junge Nationalisten (short: JN; until 13 January 2018 Junge Nationaldemokraten) is the official youth organization of the right-wing extremist NPD founded in 1967. According to the NPD statutes, the JN are an "integral part" of the party.

The JN are committed to the basic program of the NPD, but represent these points of view much more aggressively, which is evident both during demonstrations and in political style. They are observed by the Office for the Protection of the Constitution and classified as right-wing extremists. Their regular publication is called The Activist. In this central organ, under the heading "The Federal Leader Has the Word", they describe themselves as "representatives of the national revolutionary wing within the NPD". The youth organization criticizes those in the NPD who have made the "fight for parliaments" the "most important goal". Instead, "resistance and criticism are appropriate, since these developments run the risk of gradual adjustment and bourgeoisie". The JN describe themselves as anti-imperialist. Among other things, they call for the withdrawal of German troops from Afghanistan, describe Israel as the "enemy of all peoples", and refer to it as becoming a parasitic state.

The JN maintains active contacts with a network of neo-Nazi organizations across Europe, like the Nordic Resistance Movement whose Finnish independence day march it has attended, along with National Corps of Ukraine, Bulgarian National Union, Serbian Action and others.

Chairmen of the NPD
 Friedrich Thielen 1964–1967
 Adolf von Thadden 1967–1971
 Martin Mussgnug 1971–1990
 Günter Deckert 1991–1996
 Udo Voigt 1996–2011
 Holger Apfel 2011–2013
 Udo Pastörs 2013–2014
 Frank Franz 2014–present

Election results and current representation

Federal Parliament (Bundestag)

European Parliament

Literature 
 Ackermann, Robert: Warum die NPD keinen Erfolg haben kann – Organisation, Programm und Kommunikation einer rechtsextremen Partei. Budrich, Opladen 2012, .
 Brandstetter, Marc: Die „neue“ NPD: Zwischen Systemfeindschaft und bürgerlicher Fassade. Parteienmonitor Aktuell der Konrad-Adenauer-Stiftung. Bonn 2012 (online)
 Brandstetter, Marc: Die NPD unter Udo Voigt. Organisation. Ideologie. Strategie (= Extremismus und Demokratie. Bd. 25). Nomos Verlag, Baden-Baden 2013, .
 Prasse, Jan-Ole: Der kurze Höhenflug der NPD. Rechtsextreme Wahlerfolge in den 1960er Jahren. Tectum-Verlag, Marburg 2010, .
 Philippsberg, Robert: Die Strategie der NPD: Regionale Umsetzung in Ost- und Westdeutschland. Baden-Baden 2009.
 apabiz e. V.: Die NPD – Eine Handreichung zu Programm, Struktur, Personal und Hintergründen. Zweite, aktualisierte Auflage. 2008. (online) (PDF; 671 kB)

See also
 Far-right politics in Germany
 German nationalism
 Irredentism
 Politics of Germany
 List of political parties in Germany
 Frank Rennicke
Frank Franz
 List of National Democratic Party of Germany politicians

References

External links
 Party Platform of the NPD (PDF) 
 History of the National Democratic Party
 BBC news: Poll boost for German far right

1964 establishments in West Germany
Antisemitism in Germany
Anti-Zionism in Germany
Eurosceptic parties in Germany
Far-right political parties in Germany
Fascist parties in Germany
German nationalist political parties
Nationalist parties in Germany
Neo-Nazi political parties in Europe
Political parties established in 1964
Anti-immigration politics in Germany
Opposition to NATO